Patricia Büchler (born 1997), known professionally as Patty Gurdy, is a German hurdy-gurdy musician, singer, songwriter and vlogger.

Early life and career 
Büchler was born in 1997. She lived in Düsseldorf while she studied there and graduated in 2019. She earned a bachelor's degree in communication design. After playing the piano and other instruments for many years, she took up the hurdy-gurdy in 2014 and describes her genre as "dark folk-pop". She was a member of German bands Harpyie, under the stage name Io, in 2016 and Storm Seeker from 2016–2018. Her 2019 festival performances included Smaabyfestivalen in Flekkefjord, Norway and Tredegar House folk festival in Newport, Wales.

Patty released her first EP, Shapes & Patterns, on 2 March 2018. This included 3 original tracks and 3 cover songs. She released a single entitled Run on 30 August 2019. A second single, Oil, premiered on 13 September 2019. On 27 September 2019 she released her first full-length album, Pest & Power, which was composed mostly of original work. This album featured many guest appearances from well-known names, including Faun. During this time, she also wrote music for the Amazon Prime Video series Carnival Row. On 22 November 2019 Patty released the single Grieve No More (Extended Version), a song written for that series. Another EP was released on 20 November 2020, entitled Frost & Faeries and including a Christmas-themed collaboration between Patty Gurdy and Fiddler's Green, The Yule Fiddler (Christmas Time is Coming 'Round Today). Her cover of Bad Habits (originally by Ed Sheeran) was released on 30 October 2021. In addition to playing the hurdy-gurdy, she also recorded the nyckelharpa for this single. Another single, Universe Night & Day, premiered on 24 May 2022. This song was released alongside the instrumental version, Universe Night & Day (Instrumental).

She formed her live band Patty Gurdy's Circle with members of Subway to Sally. The band's musicians were Bodenski, Simon Michael, and Ingo Hampf, along with Patty, who added vocals and the hurdy-gurdy. Together they released one single, entitled Kalte Winde, on 23 April 2020. Due to the COVID-19 pandemic, Patty Gurdy's Circle was forced to disband.

Her collaborations include ASP, Alestorm, Faun, and Ayreon. She has also worked with the metal band Scardust. In July 2019, she went on tour with Scardust in the United Kingdom. On 22 March 2022 she played her first concert outside of Europe with Scardust in Israel, which was livestreamed on Play2Fund. Patty was originally supposed to play this concert in March of 2020, but due to the COVID-19 pandemic, she was not allowed to travel into Israel. Instead, she sent videos of herself to be shown at the Scardust concert without her. She guests in Scardust's music video for their song Concrete Cages, on which she played the hurdy-gurdy and sang. Patty also appears in dArtagnan's single Farewell (released in 2021), in addition to performing live with the band. In 2022, she collaborated with metal band Silverlane on their song Für Immer und Ewig. On 17 June 2022 Patty announced that she arranged part of the soundtrack for the video game Ikonei Island: An Earthlock Adventure (part of the Earthlock series of video games). On 8 July 2022 she released her part of the soundtrack as the single Piratehog Chant.

On 23 November 2022, Gurdy posted a new song called Melodies of Hope, which she also submitted as an application for the Eurovision Song Contest 2023.

Reception 
 Pirate Scum (Storm Seeker, 2016), Metal.de said "Patty ... does a fantastic job in songs like "The Longing". Timo's and Patty's vocals complement each other in this way. The successful folk melodies, which then pound the listener and are then contrasted again by Patty's expressive voice, provide the necessary portion of goosebumps." (Google translation from German)
 Shapes & Patterns EP (2018) included a cover of Over the Hills and Far Away. The Rockoutstandout reviewer wrote "Patty Gurdy’s cover with a hurdy-gurdy and vocals gives us a completely different take on the song altogether and it works very well. The echo effect on the vocals give this track that well know powerful atmosphere that the original song is able to do. I love this quirky cover and I always feel a sense of warmth when hearing the song."
 Review of Pest & Power album (2019) by Permafrost.today. "The Hurdy Gurdy is not only embedded in her name, but her music is directly translated from her mind into the green wooden body. Patty Gurdy has established not only the instrument, but herself as a versatile artist, singer and songwriter."
 Guest appearance on Alestorm's album Curse of the Crystal Coconut (2020). The Moshville Times reviewer said "More guest vocals feature on the epic “Zombies Ate My Pirate Ship” courtesy of Patty Gurdy (Patty Gurdy’s Circle) who also plays hurdy-gurdy throughout the album. I’ll tell you this, she’s got an amazing voice! This is a song that you’d expect to sound sillier than it does, but in this case it’s the vocals that are a bit daft while the music itself is as straight-laced as could be."

Discography

As Patty Gurdy

Albums and EPs

Singles

Music videos

Guest appearances

As Patty Gurdy's Circle

Single

Music video

External links

 
 Official website

References

German hurdy-gurdists
Living people
1997 births
German folk musicians
People from Ratingen
Musicians from Düsseldorf
Heinrich Heine University Düsseldorf alumni
21st-century German women musicians